This is a list of the main career statistics of professional Israeli tennis player Shahar Peer.

Performance timelines
Only main-draw results in WTA Tour, Grand Slam tournaments, Fed Cup and Olympic Games are included in win–loss records.

Singles

Doubles

Significant finals

Grand Slam finals

Doubles: 1 runner–up

WTA Premier Mandatory & 5 finals

Doubles: 2 runner–ups

WTA career finals

Singles: 9 (5 titles, 4 runners-up)

Doubles: 10 (3 titles, 7 runners-up)

WTA Challenger finals

Singles: 1 (1 title)

ITF finals

Singles: 9 (5 titles, 4 runner–ups)

Doubles: 6 (4 titles, 2 runner–ups)

Junior Grand Slam finals

Singles: 1 (1 title)

Record against other players

Top 10 wins

Career double bagels (6–0, 6–0)

Notes

External links
 
 
 

Peer, Shahar